You Lucky People! is a 1955 British comedy film directed by Maurice Elvey and starring Tommy Trinder, Mary Parker and Dora Bryan. Originally titled Get Fell In, the film was renamed to match Trinder's familiar catchphrase. It was shot in a rival French process to CinemaScope, called 'CameraScope', with the attendant publicity describing "the first feature to be made with an anamorphic lens in black and white! It's a camerascoop!". It was shot at Beaconsfield Studios near London with sets designed by the art director Ray Simm.

Premise
An intake of civilian reservists arrive at army camp to do their two weeks refresher training.

Cast
 Tommy Trinder as Tommy Smart
 Mary Parker as Private Sally Briggs
 Dora Bryan as Sergeant Hortense Tipp
 R.S.M. Brittain as Himself
 James Copeland as Private Jim Campbell
 Michael Kelly as Sergeant Manners
 Mark Singleton as Lieutenant Arthur Robson
 Charles Rolfe as Hooky
 Rolf Harris as Private Proudfoot
 Rufus Cruikshank as Sergeant Major Horace Thickpenny
 Michael Trubshawe as Lieutenant Colonel Barkstone-Gadsby
 Harold Goodwin as Private Rossiter
 Mignon O'Doherty as Colonel Trudgeon
 Derek Prentice as Cpl Jones
 Marcia Ashton as Pvt. Stubby Braithwaite
 Felix Felton as Sergeant Cook 
 Patrick Jordan as Corporal
 Kenneth Kove as Old Soldier 
 Norman Mitchell as Soldier

Reception
TV Guide wrote, "other than an occasional laugh, it's hard to find much worth recommending in this farce on British army life"; while BFI Screenonline describes how the film did steady business on its release, with Kine Weekly writing, "expertly handled by (Elvey) the doyen of English directors...team work hearty, gags both time honoured and topical and staging generous."

References

External links

You Lucky People! at BFI Screenonline

1955 films
1955 comedy films
1950s English-language films
Films directed by Maurice Elvey
British comedy films
Military humor in film
Films set in England
Films shot at Beaconsfield Studios
1950s British films
British black-and-white films